Ciao is an informal Italian verbal salutation or greeting.

Ciao may also refer to:
 Ciao (programming language)
 Ciao (film), a 2008 film by Yen Tan
 Ciao! (Mauro Scocco album) (1992)
 Ciao! (Tiga album) (2009)
 Ciao (magazine), a girls' anime and manga magazine published by Shogakukan
 Ciao (website), an e-commerce site
 Piaggio Ciao, a motorbike produced by Piaggio
 "Ciao!" (song), by Lush (1996)
 Ciao, the 1990 FIFA World Cup mascot

See also 
 CIAO (disambiguation)
 Chiao (disambiguation)